Chechłowo  is a village in the administrative district of Gmina Drohiczyn, within Siemiatycze County, Podlaskie Voivodeship, in north-eastern Poland.

According to the 1921 census, the village was inhabited by 234 people, among whom 222 were Roman Catholic, 7 Orthodox, 1 Greek Catholic and 4 Mosaic. At the same time, 224 inhabitants declared Polish nationality, 5 Belarusian, 4 Jewish and 1 another. There were 40 residential buildings in the village.

References

Villages in Siemiatycze County